A god worshiped in pre-Islamic South Arabia. Salman may have been the same as a West Semitic god called Shalman/Shalaman, which some scholars believe survives as a theophoric element in the names Solomon and Shalmaneser. The deity is also attested in texts from Ugarit, Palmyra, Hatra, and North and South Arabia.

See also
Salman (name)

References

Arabian gods
South Arabia